Parroquia de San Pedro Apóstol is a church in Tlaquepaque, in the Mexican state of Jalisco.

References

External links
 

Churches in Mexico
Tlaquepaque